The former Seal Harbor Congregational Church is a historic church building on Peabody Drive (Maine State Route 3) in Seal Harbor, Maine.  It was built in 1902, and is an elegant expression of the Shingle style in a seasonal church building.  It was listed on the National Register of Historic Places in 1985; it is now vacant.

Description and history
The former Seal Harbor Congregational Church is set on the southwest corner of Peabody Drive and Dodge Point Road.  The two-story stone and wood building is set facing northeast, toward the junction.  It has a gabled roof that descends to the top of the first floor, with large brackets at the sides.  The high foundation is of squared quarry-faced stone, and the main floors are finished in wooden shingles, with a belt course separating the floors.  The entrance, at the center of the main facade, is set back under a round stone arch that rises from the foundation, and is topped by a curved portico-like roof section.  Single windows flank the entrance outside the arch.  The second floor windows, a band of four windows, are sheltered by a rounded continuation of the main roof.  The windows used in the building are all diamond-paned casement windows.

The church was built in 1902 to provide worship services to the area's summer population; its architect was Grosvenor Atterbury.  The church was closed when a year-round church was built in Seal Harbor village, and was rescued from demolition by a local summer resident.

See also
National Register of Historic Places listings in Hancock County, Maine

References

Churches in Hancock County, Maine
Churches on the National Register of Historic Places in Maine
Churches completed in 1902
20th-century churches in the United States
Mount Desert Island
National Register of Historic Places in Hancock County, Maine
Congregational churches in Maine